Elections to the Uttar Pradesh Legislative Assembly were held on 26 March 1952. 2,604 candidates contested for the 347 constituencies in the Assembly. The Indian National Congress won the majority of seats and its leader Govind Ballabh Pant was re-elected as the Chief Minister.

After the passing of The Delimitation of Parliamentary and Assembly Constituencies Order, 1951, the constituencies were set to the ones used in this election. There were 83 two-member constituencies and 264 single-member constituencies.

Results

|- style="background-color:#E9E9E9; text-align:center;"
! colspan=2|Party !! Flag !! Seats  Contested !! Won !! % of  Seats !! Votes !! Vote %
|- style="background: #90EE90;"
| 
| style="text-align:left;" |Indian National Congress
| 
| 429 || 388 || 90.23 || 80,32,475 || 47.93
|-
| 
| style="text-align:left;" |Socialist Party
|
| 349 || 20 || 4.65 || 20,15,320 || 12.03
|-
| 
| style="text-align:left;" |Kisan Mazdoor Praja Party
|
| 268 || 1 || 0.23 || 9,55,708 || 5.70
|-
| 
| style="text-align:left;" |Bharatiya Jana Sangh
|
| 211 || 2 || 0.47 || 10,81,395 || 6.45
|-
| 
| style="text-align:left;" |Akhil Bharatiya Ram Rajya Parishad
|
| 95 || 1 || 0.23 || 2,91,247 || 1.75
|-
| 
| style="text-align:left;" |Akhil Bharatiya Hindu Mahasabha
|
| 63 || 1 || 0.23 || 2,39,110 || 1.43
|-
|
| style="text-align:left;" |Uttar Pradesh Praja Party
|
| 55 || 1 || 0.23 || 3,01,322 || 1.80
|-
|
| style="text-align:left;" |Uttar Pradesh Revolutionary Socialist Party
|
| 9 || 1 || 0.23 || 57,284 || 0.34
|-
| 
|
| 1006 || 15 || 3.49 || 32,94,500 || 19.66
|- class="unsortable" style="background-color:#E9E9E9"
! colspan = 3| Total Seats
! 430 !! style="text-align:center;" |Voters !! 4,40,89,646 !! style="text-align:center;" |Turnout !! 1,67,58,619 (38.01%)
|}

Elected members

See also
1951–52 elections in India

References

1952
Uttar
March 1952 events in Asia